David Holy (born 1979) is a German designer, publisher, radio drama director, writer, producer and entrepreneur.

Biography 
David Holy was born in Aschaffenburg, Bavaria (Germany). After leaving school, he attended the Goethe University Frankfurt to study business administration and Japanology. He dropped out of university early to pursue his interest in computer graphics and design. Subsequently, Holy successfully trained as an audio-visual media designer at a local television network, focusing mainly on 3D design and camera work.

He then founded his own company "Holysoft Studios Ltd" and decided to study media production in Dieburg. The ad agency contributed greatly to the success of various local clients and small/medium-sized companies, including the delivery of television content over Internet Protocol networks (IPTV). His hard work and dedication didn't go unnoticed: According to the magazine Videoaktiv Digital, major television networks would face serious competition due to David Holy's ambitious endeavor (2008).

In 2009, Holy established the publishing company „HK Media GmbH & Co KG“, releasing several radio drama serials between 2010 and now. Die Letzten Helden (The Last Heroes) was among the first and one of the most successful to this day. Due to the large number of contributing voice actors/actresses and long running times (up to six hours per episode and longer), the magazine Hörbücher raised the question: Is Die Letzten Helden the biggest radio drama show ever created?

Holy also devotes himself to real estate. In 2015, he established his personal Youtube channel, releasing some of his works for promotion purposes.

Work

Radio drama/audio book series 
 2008 Chronik der Verdammten (Chronicles of the Damned), 1 episode (6 in the works)
 2010 Die letzten Helden (The Last Heroes), 24 episodes and 3 specials
 2010 Heff der Chef (Heff the Boss), 24 episodes und 3 specials
 2010 Videospielhelden (Video Game Heroes), 6 episodes
 2011 Drachenlanze (Dragonlance), 12 episodes
 2012 Das Schwarze Auge (The Dark Eye), 6 audio books
 2016 Holy Klassiker (Holy Classics), Classics of World Literature, 90 episodes
 2016 Cyberdetective, 11 episodes plus soundtrack
 2016 Die Fußballbande (Soccer Friends), 7 episodes
 2018 Holy Horror, 60 episodes

Other radio dramas 
 2006 Der Zukunftszug (The Train of the Future)
 2016 Merle und die fließende Königin (Merle and the Flowing Queen), 3 radio dramas
 2017 Arkadien Trilogie (Arcadia Trilogy), 3 radio dramas

Books/novels 
 Das todgeweihte Kind (The Doomed Child), 2013, 
 Der Bund des schwarzen Gottes (The Dark God), 2013, 
 Herr der Albträume (Lord of Nightmares), 2013, 
 Silbersterns Meisterplan (Silverstar's Masterplan), 2013,

Awards and nominations 
 2008 Simply CG Award (Product Design), 2nd place
 Various Radio Drama of the Month awards for Die Letzten Helden (The Last Heroes)
 Nomination: Best Radio Drama Series - Die Letzten Helden (The Last Heroes), Ohrkanus 2011

References

External links 
 Holy's Published Work on Literra

German designers
German publishers (people)
German male writers
German radio producers
1979 births
Living people
People from Aschaffenburg
Goethe University Frankfurt alumni